Gerlach is a male given name and a surname.
Gerlach may also refer to:

 Gerlach, Nevada, United States, a census-designated place
 Gerlach Peak, the highest peak in the High Tatras, Slovakia

See also
 Gerlachs Park, a park in Malmö, Sweden
 Gerlach Barklow Co., American manufacturer of art calendars